Obukhovo is a rural locality (a village) in Staroselskoye Rural Settlement, Vologodsky District, Vologda Oblast, Russia. The population was 1 as of 2002.

Geography 
The distance to Vologda is 49 km, to Striznevo is 8 km.

References 

Rural localities in Vologodsky District